Samuel E. Fishburn (May 15, 1893 – April 11, 1965) was an American Major League Baseball player from Haverhill, Massachusetts, who appeared in 9 games for the 1919 St. Louis Cardinals, with two hits in six at bats. An alumnus of Lehigh University, Fishburn died in Bethlehem, Pennsylvania. He was Jewish.

References

1893 births
1965 deaths
Baseball players from Massachusetts
St. Louis Cardinals players
Lehigh Mountain Hawks baseball players
Jewish American baseball players
Jewish Major League Baseball players
20th-century American Jews